Yeonnam-dong 539 is a 2018 television series starring an ensemble cast. It aired on MBN from January 10 to March 28, 2018 on Wednesdays at 23:00 (KST) time slot.

Synopsis
Revolves around the story of people renting rooms in a shared house in the neighborhood of Yeonnam.

Cast
Lee Jong-hyuk as Sang Bong-tae 
A detective in the cyber crimes unit and in charge of voice phishing related activity.  
Oh Yoon-ah as Yoon Yi-na
Owner of a fitness center. 
Lee Moon-sik as Jordan
Owner of the share house. He is a retired fisherman, who sets up the share house for singles. 
Brian Joo as Lion 
Former lead singer of a boy band.
Go Na-eun as Seo Deok-hee
A job seeker in her third year of unemployment. She possesses an excellent memory and academic background, but lacks the connections.
Yang Jung-won as Yang Soo-ri
A Pilates trainer. 
Choi Woo-hyuk as Goo Tae-young
A personal trainer working at a fitness center, who is popular with the ladies.
Chunji as Jo Da-woon 
A distant but warm high school student.
Choi Jae-woo as Joon-young 
A member of the band Ryan  used to be in. He bickers with Ryan all the time, and falls in love with Deok-hee.
Oh In-hye as Chung Joo-eun

Original soundtrack

Part 1

Part 2

Part 3

Part 4

Part 5

Viewership
Note: This drama airs on cable channel / pay TV which has a relatively small audience compared to free-to-air TV / public broadcasters (KBS, MBC, SBS, and EBS).

References

External links  
 Official website

 

2018 South Korean television series debuts
2018 South Korean television series endings
Maeil Broadcasting Network television dramas